During 2009–10, Middlesbrough F.C. are competing in the Football League Championship following their relegation from the Premier League at the end of the 2008–09 season. They also competed in the League Cup and the FA Cup.

Despite relegation and pressure from fans, chairman Steve Gibson backed Gareth Southgate to lead Middlesbrough back to the Premier League as manager. However, on 20 October, both Southgate and football consultant, Alan Smith, were relieved of their duties with immediate effect. With regular skipper Emanuel Pogatetz injured, Robert Huth was named captain at the start of the season. After Huth's departure, that honour fell to Gary O'Neil.

Team kit and sponsors
Middlesbrough entered into a new shirt supply agreement with Adidas for this season. The new home shirt and goalkeepers' kit was announced on 18 June 2009. The club's sponsorship agreement with satellite navigation firm Garmin continued into the new season. The new all-cyan away kit was not revealed until 13 August, the week after the season had kicked off.

Transfers

Summer transfer window
Out of contract defender-cum-midfielder Matthew Bates ended much transfer speculation, which linked him with moves to Premier League clubs, by re-signing with Middlesbrough in a new three-year deal. Middlesbrough's first signing of the summer saw in-demand winger Mark Yeates arrive from Colchester United for an undisclosed fee, reported to be worth an initial £500,000, plus £250,000 dependent on appearances.

When Ross Turnbull left for Chelsea after seeing out his contract, manager Gareth Southgate admitted he had yet to decide whether to promote Academy graduate Jason Steele or whether to sign an experienced goalkeeper. On 6 July, the signing of experienced Welsh international keeper Danny Coyne was announced. The 35-year-old came on a free transfer from Tranmere Rovers, with the management stating that Coyne would compete with Brad Jones for the number 1 spot.

After eight seasons at the club and over two-hundred Middlesbrough appearances, Academy graduate Stewart Downing joined Aston Villa for an initial £10 million, with a further £2 million dependent on appearances, despite the player being injured and several months away from full fitness. Downing had been expected to leave this summer, after handing in a transfer request during the January transfer window, but his injury had cast doubt on a move.

Mido reportedly sealed a season-long loan move to Egyptian side El Zamalek, for a fee of £450,000, with a further £1 million possible should they wish to make the move permanent at the end of the season. The move was confirmed and completed on 3 August.

With Mido's loan move sealed, Middlesbrough were able to complete the signing of striker Leroy Lita, who signed a three-year deal. Lita had been without a club since being released by Reading at the end of last season.

On 17 August, Nathan Porritt went on loan to Darlington for 28 days; he made his professional debut against Crewe Alexandra the following day.

Nearing the end of the transfer window, the number of departures started to increase, with captain Robert Huth and Tuncay both moving to Stoke City. Huth's move was confirmed on 27 August, for a fee of £5 million, possibly rising to a Stoke-record £6 million. Tuncay's move was confirmed the following day, with Stoke paying £5 million for the Turkish player. Gareth Southgate said that, with Emanuel Pogatetz and Chris Riggott still on Boro's books, a replacement for Huth would be promoted from within, but another striker would need to be brought in to replace Tuncay.

Afonso Alves move to Al-Sadd was completed on 4 September, as the transfer window in Qatar remained open longer than in England. Keith Lamb later confirmed Middlesbrough received £7m for the move.

Between transfer windows
Being in the Championship, loan signings are permitted between the transfer windows. Middlesbrough's first such signing was defender Sean St Ledger from Preston North End on a three-month loan with a view to a permanent transfer in January.

A second loan signing, Hull City striker Caleb Folan, joined Middlesbrough on a three-month loan from 19 September. Folan suffered an injury in training in October and only made one substitute appearance for the club, returning to Hull early at the beginning of December.

On 23 September, John Johnson was loaned out to Northampton Town for one month.

On 30 October they signed their third player on loan, Marcus Bent from Birmingham City on loan for two months.

On 5 November Strachan brought in Aston Villa midfielder Isaiah Osbourne on a two-month deal.

On 17 November 2009 Gordon Strachan signed his third player, Stoke City's Dave Kitson.

Summary

In

Loans in

Trials in

Out
For departures of players out of contract at the end of 2008–09 see 2008–09 Middlesbrough F.C. season.

 Huth's initial transfer fee is £5 million, possibly rising to £6 million.

Loans Out

Trials out

Squad
The squad numbers for the 2009–10 season were announced on 27 July 2009. Brad Jones took over the number 1 shirt, while Matthew Bates moved to 4, pushing Gary O'Neil to 16. Most of the players with high squad numbers moved down the list to fill in the empty spaces. Mido was given the number 9 shirt before going out on loan, while Afonso Alves retained number 12 until he left. Due to the numerous players who transferred in and out or who came on loan, many squad numbers were used by more than 1 player throughout the season.

Appearances and goals
Appearance and goalscoring records for all the players who are in the Middlesbrough F.C. first team squad during the 2009–10 season.

|}

Pre-season
Summary

An early disruption to the new season's planning was the failure of Afonso Alves and Mido to return for the start of pre-season training. Alves returned a few days later, but it took Mido two extra weeks. He was heavily fined by the club and when he finally returned he had to catch up on missed fitness training and didn't tour with the rest of the team when they visited Scotland.

Middlesbrough's pre-season campaign consisted entirely of away fixtures. Their pre-season got off to a good start with a 3–0 win over Macclesfield Town, fielding different line-ups in both halves, with only goalkeeper Danny Coyne remaining on the field throughout. This was followed by a strong 5–0 win over Dumbarton, although Didier Digard sustained a hip flexor injury. Boro were without recognised strikers for their friendly against Carlisle United, but continued their winning run with a 2–0 win.

A friendly against Darlington was planned for 29 July, but was cancelled at Darlington's request due to their long injury list. An alternative friendly against Oldham Athletic was swiftly arranged for the same night. In that game, Middlesbrough came from a goal down to lead, 2–1, but let their lead slip and the game finished in a 2–2 draw.

Their final game saw Middlesbrough again come from behind. Rhys Williams scored his fourth goal of pre-season to level the tie against Millwall. The game, which finished 1–1, was a benefit match for former Lions and Republic of Ireland striker Richard Sadlier.

ResultsNote: Results are given with Middlesbrough score listed first. Man of the Match is according to mfc.co.uk.Championship

Results summary

Results by matchday

ResultsNote: Results are given with Middlesbrough score listed first. Man of the Match is according to mfc.co.uk.''

August
Middlesbrough kicked off the English football season with a televised Friday night game at home to last season's play-off finalists Sheffield United. With Brad Jones injured, Danny Coyne was handed his debut, along with Mark Yeates, while pre-season top scorer Rhys Williams started the game in midfield. As was their problem last season, Middlesbrough struggled to create chances in front of goal. Yeates and Adam Johnson were lively on the wings but with a lack of physical presence up front, the home side were unable to score, even following the introduction of new boy Leroy Lita in the second half. The defence coped well to keep a clean sheet, as the game petered out to a 0–0 draw.

A long trip to Swansea City brought a first away victory in the league since November, and ended their club record run of twelve consecutive away defeats. With Didier Digard out injured for two to three weeks, Gary O'Neil—who delayed a hernia operation to play—lined up in midfield, while Lita was handed his first start up front. Adam Johnson scored Boro's first goal of the season when his cross-cum-shot slipped past Swansea goalkeeper Dorus de Vries. Marvin Emnes got Middlesbrough's second while substitute Tuncay, still expected to leave before the end of the month, headed home the third from a Johnson corner. The 3–0 win was their biggest away from home since August 2005.

A second consecutive away win followed at Scunthorpe. Adam Johnson latched onto a fine ball from Gary O'Neil and lobbed it over the head of Scunthorpe goalkeeper Joe Murphy. Their second goal came in a frantic start to the second half. Rhys Williams was brought down in the box with just two minutes played, and the referee awarded a penalty. Murphy saved Johnson's spot kick, but Johnson got to the ball first and was subsequently brought down by the Scunthorpe keeper. A second penalty was awarded, and this time Johnson fired home. Scunthorpe had plenty of chances to mount a comeback but Danny Coyne pulled off a series of good saves to maintain his side's record as the only one yet to concede a goal in the Championship.

Middlesbrough's winning run continued with a 2–0 win over Doncaster Rovers. Marvin Emnes had to be taken off with a head injury following a collision with Doncaster goalkeeper Neil Sullivan. His replacement, Tuncay, put Boro ahead almost immediately after his introduction, while Leroy Lita got his first goal for the club in the second half. The win moved them top of the table, until Cardiff regained the spot the following day.

Boro suffered their first loss in the Championship, away to Bristol City, going down, 2–1. A Nicky Maynard stoppage time finish condemned Middlesbrough, having scored earlier in the game as well. This was the visitors' first game without Robert Huth and Tuncay, who had both moved to Stoke City.

September
Following the international break, Middlesbrough played against Ipswich Town, winning, 3–1. Gary O'Neil scored his first for the season, which was followed up by substitute Jérémie Aliadière's brace in the second half. However, a penalty was conceded in stoppage time in Ipswich's favour, ending Boro's Riverside clean sheet streak this season.

Middlesbrough continued their great start to September, defeating Sheffield Wednesday, 3–1. A Darren Purse own goal equalised the game, followed by second half strikes from Jérémie Aliadière and Adam Johnson which led the side to victory. Following Newcastle's loss to Blackpool, Middlesbrough leapfrogged Newcastle into 2nd, and are only one point behind WBA.

Middlesbrough's biggest test of the season came the following week, against West Bromwich. After a bright start, Rhys Williams conceded a foul and former Boro trainee Chris Brunt scored his first of two, following a deflection off Julio Arca. Everything went downhill from hereon, with West Bromwich dominating proceedings. Their second came from a goalkeeping miskick, as Danny Coyne left his line to clear, but only to Brunt, who finished from 50 yards out into an empty goal. Boro, played poorly, offering one of their worst performances so far. This result dropped the Boro to third, below Newcastle United, and affected their goal difference greatly. After the game, Gareth Southgate admitted his team had been 'battered'.

Middlesbrough started off brightly against Coventry City, taking a 2–0 lead into half time, with goals coming from St Ledger and Rhys Williams. However, two second half goals to Coventry, including one in the 5th minute of stoppage time from Leon Best condemned Boro to a disappointing draw.
|}

League Cup
Middlesbrough were given a first round bye. They faced Nottingham Forest in the second round. Despite Middlesbrough taking the lead through Adam Johnson, they lost the game in extra time 2 – 1. This was Middlesbrough's first loss for the season.

FA Cup
Middlesbrough were given a first round bye. They faced Manchester City in the third round. With the only goal scored by Benjani Mwaruwari for City, Middlesbrough finally lost, 0–1.

Staff
Before the season began, a shakeup in the backroom team saw Malcolm Crosby leave his post as assistant manager, a role he had held for three years, since Gareth Southgate began as manager. He had joined Middlesbrough two years prior to that, as manager of the reserve side. Head of sports science Chris Barnes, sports psychologist Michael Caulfield, fitness coach Frank Nuttall and masseuse Dave French also left the club as part of a restructuring of the back room team.

Gareth Southgate's former manager at Crystal Palace, Alan Smith, was brought in as a football consultant. Southgate and chairman Steve Gibson discussed the matter in detail before the appointment, which sees Smith take a behind-the-scenes role, rather than being involved on the training pitch or in the dressing room.

On 20 October, Gareth Southgate and Alan Smith were both relieved of their duties with immediate effect.

On 3 May, the day after the final game of the season, Middlesbrough announced that first team coach Colin Cooper, goalkeeping coach Stephen Pears and reserve team coach Martin Scott had all been relieved of their duties, with Gordon Strachan planning changes for a promotion push next season.

Other events
A special promotion on Half Season Cards was launched in early December, which offered fans who bought the tickets a chance to "win" a full refund, if Middlesbrough won their first four Championship games after Christmas. However, following feedback from a number of existing Season Card holders, who had paid their money up front long before the season began, the special offer was swiftly withdrawn.

During half time of a Championship match against Nottingham Forest at the Riverside Stadium, which ended 1–1, Top Gear presenters Jeremy Clarkson, Richard Hammond and James May made a surprise appearance to promote their automotive exhibition at the MIMA. They originally walked onto the pitch wearing rival Newcastle United's shirts as a joke before quickly changing into Middlesbrough shirts to promote the exhibition.

References

2009–10 Football League Championship by team
2009-10